The Gift of Rock is a fifth studio Christmas album by American rock band Smash Mouth. It was released on 2005 through Beautiful Bomb Records. It contains mostly covers of various artists including Louis Armstrong, Ringo Starr, the Kinks and the Ramones.

Track listing 

 "Father Christmas" – 3:38
 "Baggage Claim" – 3:31
 "Don't Believe in Christmas" (Gerry Roslie) – 1:47
 "Christmas (Baby Please Come Home)" – 3:14
 "Zat You, Santa Claus?" – 2:19
 "The Christmas Song" – 2:34
 "Snoopy's Christmas" – 2:15
 "Christmas Ain't Christmas" – 2:03
 "Come On Christmas, Christmas Come On" – 2:23
 "Merry Christmas (I Don't Want to Fight Tonight)" – 2:36
 "2000 Miles" – 3:25

References

External links

The Gift of Rock at YouTube (streamed copy where licensed)

Smash Mouth albums
2005 Christmas albums
Christmas albums by American artists
Rock Christmas albums
Alternative rock Christmas albums
Pop Christmas albums